The leader of the Labour Party is the highest position within the United Kingdom's Labour Party. The current holder of the position is Keir Starmer, who was elected to the position on 4 April 2020, following his victory in the party's leadership election.

The post of Leader of the Labour Party was officially created in 1922. Before this, between when Labour MPs were first elected in 1906 and the general election in 1922, when substantial gains were made, the post was known as Chairman of the Parliamentary Labour Party. In 1970, the positions of leader of the Labour Party and chairman of the Parliamentary Labour Party were separated.

In 1921, John R. Clynes became the first leader of the Labour Party to have been born in England; all party leaders before him had been born in Scotland. In 1924, Ramsay MacDonald became the first ever Labour prime minister, leading a minority government which lasted nine months. Clement Attlee would become the first Labour leader to lead a majority government in 1945. The first to be born in Wales was Neil Kinnock, who was elected in 1983. The most electorally successful leaders of the Labour Party to date are Tony Blair, who won three consecutive electoral victories in 1997, 2001 (both landslide victories), and 2005, and Harold Wilson, who won four general elections out of five contested, in 1964, 1966, February 1974 and October 1974. , the only Labour leaders not to contest a general election (excluding temporary acting leaders) are George Lansbury (who stood down), John Smith (who died in office), and Keir Starmer.

When the Labour Party is in opposition, as it currently is, the leader of the Labour Party usually acts (as the second largest party) as the leader of the Opposition, and chairs the shadow cabinet. Concordantly, when the Party is in government, the leader would usually become the prime minister of the United Kingdom, first lord of the Treasury and minister for the civil service, as well as appointing the cabinet.

Selection process
Unlike other British political party leaders, the Labour leader does not have the power to dismiss or appoint their deputy. Both the leader and deputy leader are elected by an alternative vote system. 

From 1980 to 2014 an electoral college was used, with a third of the votes allocated to the Party's MPs and MEPs, a third to individual members of the Labour Party, and a third to individual members of all affiliated organisations, including socialist societies and trade unions.

The 2015 leadership election used a "one member, one vote" system, in which the votes of party members and members of affiliated organisations are counted equally. MPs' and MEPs' votes are not counted separately, although a candidate needs to receive the support of 10% of Labour MPs in order to appear on the ballot.

Leaders of the Labour Party (1906–present)

A list of leaders (including acting leaders) since 1906.

Leaders in the House of Lords

Retirement
It is not uncommon for a retired leader of the Labour Party to be granted a peerage upon their retirement, particularly if they served as prime minister; examples of this include Clement Attlee and Harold Wilson. However, Neil Kinnock was also elevated to the House of Lords, despite never being prime minister, and Michael Foot declined a similar offer.

See also

History of the Labour Party (UK)
Leader of the Conservative Party (UK)
Leader of the Liberal Democrats

Notes

References

Further reading

 
Organisation of the Labour Party (UK)
Labour Party (UK)-related lists
Labour UK